Daguanying Station is an interchange station on Line 7 and Line 16 of the Beijing Subway. Line 16 opened on December 31, 2022.

Station Layout 
Both the line 7 and line 16 stations have an underground island platforms.
There are 5 exits, lettered B, C, D, E and F. Exits B and C are accessible via elevators.

Gallery

References

Railway stations in China opened in 2014
Beijing Subway stations in Xicheng District